Owen James Truelove (24 October 1937 – 14 November 2006) was the first man to fly from the United Kingdom to New Zealand with a motor glider. He died in a gliding accident in New Zealand in November 2006.

Truelove had served in the RAF (reaching the Rank of Air Commodore), as an Aeronautical and Weapons Engineer, on the Vulcan and Hunter. His service took him to Aden, United States and Cyprus as well as London and Lincolnshire. He retired from the RAF as Director of Aircraft Engineering in 1989 after 33 years service. Following his retirement from the RAF he worked as a consultant in the Defence and Logistics Industry.

External links
 Glider crash kills father and son. BBC News. 16 November 2016
 Record glider flight
 Severe down draft causes glider to crash
 Obituary, The Daily Telegraph, 20 November 2006

1937 births
2006 deaths
2006 in New Zealand
Accidental deaths in New Zealand
Victims of aviation accidents or incidents in New Zealand
Royal Air Force officers
People educated at Dulwich College